Land mobile station (or land mobile radio station) is a mobile radio station in the land mobile service that operates within a country or continent.

Each station is classified by the service in which it operates permanently or temporarily.

References / sources 

 International Telecommunication Union (ITU)

Radio stations and systems ITU